This page documents the tornadoes and tornado outbreaks of 2000, primarily (but not entirely) in the United States. Most tornadoes form in the U.S., although some events may take place internationally, particularly in parts of neighboring southern Canada during the summer season.

Synopsis

The 2000 tornado season as a whole was slightly below normal to near average. There were 1,075 tornadoes confirmed in the United States. January was inactive with just 16 tornado reports. Activity in February was high, with several strong tornadoes throughout the South. March was also quite active, with a notable tornado in Fort Worth, Texas taking place at the end of the month. The spring months saw normal activity, with substantial outbreaks in both April and May. Most of June was marked by below normal activity, with 135 tornadoes confirmed. The end of June and all of July had tornado reports nearly every day, resulting in an active early summer period. This activity continued into the beginning of August, but the latter part of the month saw few tornadoes, as well as the start of September. The rest of September was slightly more active. The fall months had normal activity; however, a pattern shift at the end of November caused December as a whole to be inactive, even though the F4 storm in Tuscaloosa, Alabama was the second-deadliest December tornado since 1950.

Events

January

There were 16 tornadoes confirmed in the U.S. in January.

January 3

A small, but damaging outbreak of 11 tornadoes impacted Arkansas, Mississippi, Indiana, and Kentucky.

February
There were 56 tornadoes confirmed in the U.S. in February.

February 13–14

A storm system spawned strong tornadoes across the Southeast on February 13, killing 19 people and injuring 175, making it the deadliest outbreak in the year. All the deaths occurred in Southwestern Georgia. The most notable tornado was an F3 storm that caused 11 fatalities in the city of Camilla. Several other states, such as Alabama, Arkansas, Florida, and Tennessee were affected on the February 13, and a few weak tornadoes struck the Carolinas on the February 14.

March
There were 102 tornadoes confirmed in the U.S. in March.

March 28

A low-end F3 tornado struck the city of Fort Worth, Texas on March 28, killing two people and injuring 80. The storm took a  through the city, damaging skyscrapers and other high-rise buildings. The same storm also produced another F3 tornado, in Arlington, Texas caused $500 million in damage along its  and leaving about 80 people homeless. The tornadoes were a part of small outbreak of tornadoes, the rest of which were rated F0 or F1.

April
There were 135 tornadoes confirmed in the U.S. in April.

April 3
A storm system spawned 29 tornadoes from Texas to South Carolina on April 3, mainly F0 and F1 storms. One of the strongest tornadoes, an F2, killed one person in Piedmont, Alabama.

April 23

An outbreak of tornadoes on April 23, Easter Sunday, produced 33 tornadoes across Oklahoma, Texas, Arkansas, and Louisiana, with three of these being rated F3. An F1 tornado moved through Shreveport, Louisiana, injuring six people.

May
There were 241 tornadoes confirmed in the U.S. in May.

May 11–12
On May 11, an F3 tornado killed one person near Cedar Falls, Iowa. On May 12, another F3 storm caused two fatalities in Laguna Park, Texas.

May 17–18
A storm system produced 69 tornadoes from May 17 to May 18, which occurred from Colorado to New York. Most were rated F0, but one powerful F3 storm near Brady, Nebraska injured two people.

May 27
An F3 tornado touched down in Tennessee.

June
There were 135 tornadoes confirmed in the U.S. in June.

July
There were 148 tornadoes confirmed in the U.S. in July.

July 14 (Canada)

A severe thunderstorm over the Rockies tracked eastward across the province during the early evening on July 14. At 7:00 MDT, an F3 tornado touched down and moved toward Green Acres Campground at Pine Lake, Alberta. 12 people at the campground were killed and over 100 were injured. Winds up to  caused $15.2 million (2000 Canadian dollars) in damage to the campground. Overall, it ranks as the fourth-deadliest tornado in Canadian history.

July 25
A moderate outbreak of 14 tornadoes took place across Minnesota, 12 of these were rated F0; however, a violent storm hit the city of Granite Falls in Yellow Medicine County, which killed one and injured 15. The tornado first touched down in rural parts of the county west-northwest of Granite Falls, hitting the city at 6:10 pm. Most of the damage in Granite Falls was rated F2 and F3, but the extent of the damage at the corner of 9th avenue and 14th street caused the National Weather Service to classify it as an F4 tornado. The town and surrounding area suffered millions of dollars in property damage as a result of this tornado, which is ranked as one of the strongest in Minnesota's history.

August
There were 52 tornadoes confirmed in the U.S. in August.

September
There were 47 tornadoes confirmed in the U.S. in September.

September 20
Four tornadoes touched down across Ohio. The most notable storm was an F4 tornado that moved through Xenia. One person was killed and 100 were injured along its 21-mile path, which paralleled the path of the famous tornado in 1974. It was that tornado which prompted local officials to install 10 tornado sirens across Greene County, Ohio, which failed to function during the tornado, due to power outages and no battery backup system. In the end, 48 homes were destroyed and 125 were damaged by the tornado.

October
There were 64 tornadoes confirmed in the U.S. in October.

November
There were 50 tornadoes confirmed in the U.S. in November.

December
There were 26 tornadoes confirmed in the U.S. in December.

December 16

After a lull in activity, a storm system produced a moderate outbreak of tornadoes on December 16, the strongest which killed 11 and injured 125 in Tuscaloosa, Alabama and was rated F4. The tornado moved through portions of Southeastern Tuscaloosa destroying 110 homes and causing $12 million in damages (2000 US dollars). This tornado is tied as the 4th deadliest December tornado since 1950, only behind the F5 in Vicksburg, Mississippi on December 5, 1953, the 2021 Western Kentucky tornado on December 10, 2021, and the 2021 Bowling Green tornado on December 11, 2021. In the end, the entire outbreak of 24 tornadoes was responsible for 12 fatalities and $35 million in damage across seven states.

See also
 Tornado
 Tornadoes by year
 Tornado records
 Tornado climatology
 Tornado myths
 List of tornado outbreaks
 List of F5 and EF5 tornadoes
 List of F4 and EF4 tornadoes
 List of North American tornadoes and tornado outbreaks
 List of 20th-century Canadian tornadoes and tornado outbreaks
 List of European tornadoes and tornado outbreaks
 List of tornadoes and tornado outbreaks in Asia
 List of Southern Hemisphere tornadoes and tornado outbreaks
 List of tornadoes striking downtown areas
 List of tornadoes with confirmed satellite tornadoes
 Tornado intensity
 Fujita scale
 Enhanced Fujita scale
 International Fujita scale
 TORRO scale

References

External links
 U.S. tornadoes in 2000 - Tornado History Project
 Storm Data "2000 Annual Summaries" (NCDC)

 
2000 meteorology
Tornado-related lists by year
2000-related lists